Michael Stich won in the final 6–3, 6–2, 7–6(7–5) against Goran Ivanišević.

Seeds
A champion seed is indicated in bold text while text in italics indicates the round in which that seed was eliminated.

  Boris Becker (semifinals)
  Yevgeny Kafelnikov (first round)
  Goran Ivanišević (final)
  Richard Krajicek (quarterfinals)
  Sergi Bruguera (first round)
  Michael Stich (champion)
  Arnaud Boetsch (first round)
  Marc Rosset (quarterfinals)

Draw

 NB: The Final was the best of 5 sets while all other rounds were the best of 3 sets.

Final

Section 1

Section 2

References
 1996 European Community Championships Draw

ECC Antwerp
1996 ATP Tour